Rusi Nausherwan Dinshaw (7 February 1928 – 24 March 2014) was a Pakistani cricketer who played first-class cricket from 1948 to 1952. 

A left-handed batsman, Dinshaw played in both unofficial Tests when Ceylon toured Pakistan in 1949-50, without making a substantial score. Later he was a member of the first Pakistan Test squad, which toured India in 1952–53. He never played in a Test, but he is the only Parsi to have ever been selected in a Pakistan Test squad.

References

1928 births
2014 deaths
Pakistani cricketers
Parsi people
Pakistani Zoroastrians
Sindh cricketers
Cricketers from Karachi